Georgios Chionidis (born 25 June 1991) is a Greek footballer who plays for Iraklis in the Greek Football League as a striker. Previously he had played professional football for Ionikos and Pontioi Katerinis.

Club career
Chionidis was raised in Pontioi Katerinis academy. In 2009, he moved to Panathinaikos' academies. In 2010, he signed a professional contract with Ionikos. He debuted for the club in a home win against Thrasyvoulos and scored his first goal in an away defeat against Doxa Drama. In 2011, he signed for Pontioi Katerinis. After the club's merger with Iraklis he moved to the new club's squad and debuted for Iraklis in an away draw against Doxa Kranoula. His first goal was an injury time equaliser in an away match against Niki Volos.

Personal
Chionidis is the son of Katerini's mayor, Savvas Chionidis.

References

External links 
 Player profile in Iraklis' Official site

Living people
1991 births
Greek footballers
Ionikos F.C. players
Iraklis Thessaloniki F.C. players
Association football forwards
Footballers from Katerini